The Thessalian plain is the dominant geographical feature of the Greek region of Thessaly.

The plain is formed by the Pineios River and its tributaries and is surrounded by mountains: the Pindus mountain range to the west, which separates Thessaly from Epirus; Mount Othrys and its outliers in the south; Mount Pelion to the east; Mount Ossa and Mount Olympus to the northeast, with the pass of the Tempe Valley leading to Macedonia; and the Chasia and Kamvounia mountains to the north.

The plain was extremely fertile, and up until the early 20th century the area was a breadbasket for Greece. The existence of the plain also made Thessaly one of the few areas in ancient Greece that could field large numbers of cavalry; the Thessalian cavalry was an important component in the Ancient Macedonian army of Philip II and Alexander the Great.

Gallery 

Geography of Thessaly
Plains of Greece